Facebook Slingshot was an instant messaging software application for sharing photos and videos with friends, designed by Facebook. The app was launched on June 18, 2014, for Android and iOS devices.
 The app was discontinued and removed from the app store and Google Play store in December 2015, after Facebook shut down its "Creative Labs" division.

References

External links 
 Official webpage
 
 

Freeware
XMPP clients
Android (operating system) software
IOS software
Image-sharing websites
Facebook software